The Albert Edward Bridge is a railway bridge spanning the River Severn at Coalbrookdale in Shropshire, England.

History
Opened on 1 November 1864 and named after the Prince of Wales (later Edward VII), its design is almost identical to Victoria Bridge which carries the Severn Valley Railway over the Severn between Upper Arley and Bewdley in Worcestershire.  Designed by John Fowler, its  span cast iron arch has four ribs, each of nine parts bolted together. The patterns for the radiused beam castings for the bridge were prepared by Thomas Parker at the Coalbrookdale Iron Company. Originally it was built to carry the Wenlock, Craven Arms and Lightmoor Extension Railway of the Wellington and Severn Junction Railway across the river. Until the closure of Ironbridge power station it carried coal traffic as part of the line between Lightmoor Junction and Ironbridge Power Station.

The bridge's timber and wrought iron deck was replaced by a structural steel deck in 1933. It may be one of the last large cast iron railway bridges to have been built. Due to its age and the condition of the ironwork, traffic over the bridge is restricted to a  speed limit to minimise stress. Although it carries two tracks only the one on the downstream side is still in use.

The bridge is a Grade II Listed Building, one half by Shropshire Council, the other by Telford and Wrekin District Council as the boundary is mid-span.

Telford Steam Railway have aspirations to run trains over the bridge using the presently unused track as part of their southern extension to Buildwas.

See also 
Crossings of the River Severn

References

Bibliography
Cragg, R., Civil Engineering Heritage - Wales & West Central England, Thomas Telford Publishing, 2nd edn., 1997,

External links 

Telford Steam Railway

Bridges across the River Severn
Railway bridges in Shropshire
Bridges completed in 1864
Grade II listed buildings in Shropshire
Ironbridge Gorge
Cast-iron arch bridges in England